Ari Daniel Shapiro is a freelance science journalist based in Boston, Massachusetts. Shapiro reports through various public and private media, including National Public Radio, Public Radio International, The New York Times, and Nova.

Education
Ph.D. in biological oceanography from MIT and the Woods Hole Oceanographic Institution
 Boston College, 2001

Career 
In addition to his work as a reporter, Shapiro is a Senior Producer for The Story Collider, a live storytelling show. He says that he works to achieve greater science literacy for his listeners, telling Nieman Storyboard, "That’s why I don’t like to think about dumbing something down. I think people can handle complexity. Because I think people are curious beings somewhere inside."

References

American male journalists
NPR personalities
Living people
Year of birth missing (living people)
Massachusetts Institute of Technology alumni
Boston College alumni